Gates of Metal Fried Chicken of Death is the debut studio album by Massacration, a fictional heavy metal band originally conceived for sketches by the Brazilian comedy troupe Hermes & Renato. Announced in July 2005 under the working title "Kings of Metal Fried Chicken of Death" (in a possible allusion to Manowar's 1988 album Kings of Metal), it was initially made available for streaming on MTV Brasil's official website on October 4 and released physically through Deckdisc six days later. The album counts with guest appearances by Sérgio Mallandro (on the track "Metal Glu-Glu") and Ratos de Porão vocalist João Gordo (on the "Intro", in which he is heard reading a cake recipe with a booming, guttural voice), who also produced it under the pseudonym "Rick Rubinho" (parodying Rick Rubin).

"The God Master", a tribute to humorist Costinha (who was a huge influence for Hermes & Renato's comedy style), contains samples of his 1981 comedy album O Peru da Festa. Likewise, "Away Doom" is composed mostly of samples of shouts by then-Hermes & Renato member Gil Brother. The cover art was drawn by cartoonist and illustrator , and is somewhat reminiscent of Manowar's 1996 album Louder Than Hell.

Gates of Metal Fried Chicken of Death was critically acclaimed upon its release, with its humorous and inventive songwriting and guest appearances being praised, and according to 2006 data it sold over 40,000 copies. Music videos were made for "Cereal Metal", "Evil Papagali" and "Metal Is the Law", the latter receiving a nomination for an MTV Video Music Brazil Award in 2006, in the "Video of the Year" category; "Metal Massacre Attack (Aruê Aruô)", "Metal Bucetation" and "Metal Milkshake" had been released in advance in 2004.

Track listing

I "Metal Bucetation" contains a techno remix of "Metal Massacre Attack (Aruê Aruô)" as a hidden track at 4:04, after 30 seconds of silence.

Personnel
Massacration
 Detonator (Bruno Sutter) – vocals
 Blondie Hammett (Fausto Fanti) – lead guitar,  additional vocals
 Metal Avenger (Marco Antônio Alves) – bass guitar, additional vocals

Additional musicians
 João Gordo – vocals (track 1)
 Sérgio Mallandro – additional vocals (track 11)
 Gil Brother – vocals (track 12)
 Straupelator (Fernando Lima) – drums

Production
 Rick Rubinho (João Gordo) – production
 Mozart Couto – cover art
 João Augusto – art direction
 Sérgio Soffiatti – recording, mixing
 Carlos Freitas – mastering
 Ricardo Zupa, Felipe Aguillar – photography

Notes
  A. From "papagaio" (Portuguese for "parrot")
  B. From "buceta" (Portuguese for "pussy")

References

2005 debut albums
Massacration albums
Albums produced by João Gordo